Dominic Benhura (born 1968) is a Zimbabwean sculptor.

Benhura was born in Murewa, to the northeast of [Harare].  His father died before his birth, and he was raised by his mother.  As he was an excellent student, it was suggested that he be sent to Salisbury for further studies.  His uncle had a home in the suburb of Tafara, and Benhura went to live there at the age of ten; he lived with his cousin Tapfuma Gutsa, already a well-known sculptor.  Benhura began polishing his cousin's sculptures, but soon began carving himself, making small offcuts before moving onto large stone.  He sold his first piece at twelve.

Despite having no formal training, Benhura turned to sculpting full-time upon the finish of his schooling, showing his work at the Chapungu Sculpture Park for the first time in 1987.  He joined the resident artist program there in 1990, staying until acquiring a home in Athlone, Harare, in 1995.  Through the program he worked on larger pieces; he also began traveling during this period, attending workshops in Botswana, the United States, Belgium, the Netherlands, Denmark, and Germany.  He began to add metal to his stone sculptures.

Benhura is considered to be part of the second generation of Zimbabwean stonecarvers. In 2016, he sculpted a statue of Robert Mugabe.

External links

Biography
Dominic Benhura's Official Website

1968 births
Living people
People from Mashonaland West Province
20th-century Zimbabwean sculptors
21st-century Zimbabwean sculptors